New Tai Lue refers to:

 New Tai Lue alphabet, alphabet for writing the Tai Lü language
 New Tai Lue (Unicode block), block of Unicode characters for the New Tai Lue alphabet